Safka may refer to:

 Jim Safka (born 1968), American chief executive
 Melanie Safka (born 1947), American singer-songwriter
 Finnish Anti-Fascist Committee (SAFKA), an organisation